John Wesley Broomes (born 1969) is a United States district judge of the United States District Court for the District of Kansas.

Biography
Broomes earned his Bachelor of Science, with high honors, from the University of Texas at Austin. He received his Juris Doctor from Washburn University School of Law, where he graduated class Valedictorian with a certificate in natural resources law.

Before entering law school, Broomes was a Lieutenant in the United States Navy Submarine Force, where his awards included the Navy and Marine Corps Commendation Medal and three Navy and Marine Corps Achievement Medals. Earlier in his career, he served as a law clerk to both Judge Monti Belot and Magistrate Judge Donald W. Bostwick on the United States District Court for the District of Kansas.
Before becoming a judge, he was a member of the Hinkle Law Firm LLC in Wichita, Kansas, where he practiced in the firm's Business Litigation Group with a focus on natural resources law.

Federal judicial service

On September 7, 2017, President Donald Trump nominated Broomes to serve as a United States District Judge of the United States District Court for the District of Kansas, to the seat vacated by Judge J. Thomas Marten, who assumed senior status on May 1, 2017. A hearing on his nomination before the Senate Judiciary Committee took place on November 15, 2017. On December 7, 2017, his nomination was reported out of committee by voice vote. On April 12, 2018, the United States Senate voted to invoke cloture by a 74–24 vote. His nomination was confirmed later that day by a voice vote. He received his commission on April 16, 2018.

References

External links
 
 

1969 births
Living people
21st-century American lawyers
21st-century American judges
Judges of the United States District Court for the District of Kansas
Kansas lawyers
People from New Orleans
United States district court judges appointed by Donald Trump
United States Navy officers
University of Texas at Austin alumni
Washburn University alumni